Daulat is a 1982 Bollywood action film directed by Mohan Segal.The film stars Vinod Khanna, Raj Babbar,  Zeenat Aman and Amjad Khan in lead roles. The music was composed by R D Burman. A couple of songs became popular. "Teri Har Ada Hai Haseen", duet song sung by Kishore Kumar and Asha Bhosale, is an evergreen, charming classic.

Cast
Vinod Khanna as Ravi / Kunwar Dilip Singh
Zeenat Aman as Geeta
Raj Babbar as Sushil
Deven Verma as Murli
Amjad Khan as Joseph D'Souza / Mr. Tripathi
Shreeram Lagoo as Ghanshyam / Vikram Singh
Om Shivpuri as Police Commissioner Chaudhary
Chand Usmani as Mrs. Chaudhary
Sarla Yeolekar as Sushma's Aunty
Sarika as Sushma
Ramesh Deo as Dharamdas
Seema Deo as Radhika
Birbal as Mothu
Dev Kumar as Raghunath Singh
Mac Mohan as Shekhar Singh
Yunus Parvez as Daaga

Music
The music was composed by Rahul Dev Burman and lyrics written by Vitthalbhai Patel and Nida Fazli.

Playback singers
Lata Mangeshkar
Asha Bhosle
Kishore Kumar
Suresh Wadkar

External links
 

1982 films
Indian crime action films
1980s Hindi-language films
1980s crime action films
Films scored by R. D. Burman
Hindi-language action films